Rolling Hills is a city on the Palos Verdes Peninsula, in Los Angeles County, California, United States. Rolling Hills is a gated community with private roads with three entry gates. Homes are single-story 19th century California ranch or Spanish haciendas exemplified by architect Wallace Neff. Incorporated in 1957, Rolling Hills maintains a rural and equestrian character, with no traffic lights, multi-acre lots with ample space between homes, and wide equestrian paths along streets and property lines.

Rolling Hills has the third highest median house value in the United States. Homes are required to have white exterior paint. Homeowners are also required to maintain horse property on their lots, or at minimum keep land where stalls could be built. The community was developed by A. E. Hanson, who also developed Hidden Hills.

Residents work, shop, attend school, and obtain other services in the other towns on the Palos Verdes Peninsula as the only commercially zoned land within the city is occupied by the Rolling Hills City Hall, Rolling Hills Community Association, and LA County Fire Department Station 56. As of the 2020 census, the city population was 1,739, down from 1,860 at the 2010 census.

Geography

The city borders Rolling Hills Estates to the north and Rancho Palos Verdes on all other sides (including the empty Portuguese Bend landslide area to the south).

Rolling Hills is located at  (33.759350, −118.341550).

Demographics

At the 2000 census, Rolling Hills was the 21st richest place in the United States (based upon per capita income), and 4th richest for places with a population of at least 1,000.

2010
At the 2010 census Rolling Hills had a population of 1,860. The racial makeup of Rolling Hills was 1,437 (77.3%) White (74.1% Non-Hispanic White), 29 (1.6%) African American, 5 (0.3%) Native American, 303 (16.3%) Asian, 2 (0.1%) Pacific Islander, 24 (1.3%) from other races, and 60 (3.2%) from two or more races. Hispanic or Latino of any race were 102 people (5.5%).

The whole population lived in households, no one lived in non-institutionalized group quarters and no one was institutionalized.

There were 663 households, 199 (30.0%) had children under the age of 18 living in them, 491 (74.1%) were opposite-sex married couples living together, 27 (4.1%) had a female householder with no husband present, 21 (3.2%) had a male householder with no wife present.  There were 11 (1.7%) unmarried opposite-sex partnerships, and 9 (1.4%) same-sex married couples or partnerships. 98 households (14.8%) were one person and 66 (10.0%) had someone living alone who was 65 or older. The average household size was 2.81.  There were 539 families (81.3% of households); the average family size was 3.08.

The age distribution was 404 people (21.7%) under the age of 18, 109 people (5.9%) aged 18 to 24, 191 people (10.3%) aged 25 to 44, 643 people (34.6%) aged 45 to 64, and 513 people (27.6%) who were 65 or older.  The median age was 51.7 years. For every 100 females, there were 91.8 males.  For every 100 females age 18 and over, there were 91.1 males.

The homeowner vacancy rate was 1.4%; the rental vacancy rate was 3.4%.  1,778 people (95.6% of the population) lived in owner-occupied housing units and 82 people (4.4%) lived in rental housing units.

2000
At the 2000 census there were 1,871 people in 645 households, including 554 families, in the city. The population density was 607.7 inhabitants per square mile (234.5/km). The racial makeup of the city was 79.8% White, 2.0% African American, 14.0% Asian, 0.5% Pacific Islander, 1.2% from other races, and 2.5% from two or more races. Hispanic or Latino of any race were 4.5%.

Of the 645 households 33.8% had children under the age of 18 living with them, 80.6% were married couples living together, 3.4% had a female householder with no husband present, and 14.1% were non-families. 12.4% of households were one person and 8.1% were one person aged 65 or older.  The average household size was 2.90 and the average family size was 3.11.

The age distribution was 25.9% under the age of 18, 4.1% from 18 to 24, 15.1% from 25 to 44, 32.8% from 45 to 64, and 22.1% 65 or older.  The median age was 48 years. For every 100 females, there were 96.1 males.  For every 100 females age 18 and over, there were 92.5 males.

The median household income was in excess of $200,000, as was the median family income. Males had a median income in excess of $100,000 versus $52,500 for females. The per capita income for the city was $111,031. None of the families and 1.3% of the population were below the poverty line. No one under 18 or older than 65 was living below the poverty line.

Education
The city is served by Palos Verdes Peninsula Unified School District. PVPUSD schools have constantly ranked among the best in California and the nation. Since 2013, the Washington Post has consistently recognized Palos Verdes Peninsula High School in the publication's list of "America's Most Challenging Schools" and once listed it as the 8th best public or private high school in the nation. School data website, niche.com ranked Palos Verdes Peninsula High School #9 of California's best public high schools of 2016. The prestigious Chadwick School is an independent 45 acre, K-12 private school that also serves the area. According to Business Insider, in 2014 niche.com named Chadwick as one of the top private high schools in America.

Politics
In 2009, Rolling Hills had the third highest percentage of registered Republicans of any city in California, with 61.3% of its 1,441 registered voters registered as Republicans. 19.4% of voters were registered Democrats, and 16.3% "declined to state."

As of February 10, 2021, there were 1,577 registered voters in Rolling Hills, California. Of these voters, 737 (46.73%) were registered with the Republican party, 388 (24.60%) were registered with the Democratic Party, 357 (22.64%) were not affiliated with a political party, and 95 (6.02%) were registered with a third party. According to that same report, Rolling Hills is one of only ten incorporated municipalities in Los Angeles County that has more registered Republicans than registered Democrats, out of 87 total.

Rolling Hills has voted for the Republican candidate in every presidential and gubernatorial election since its incorporation, often by large margins. In 2016, Los Angeles County gave Donald Trump roughly 21% of the vote, and Rolling Hills was one of only five cities in Los Angeles County that was carried by Trump. In 2020, the city supported Trump's re-election bid by a margin of 11.84%. This was the lowest margin of victory for a Republican presidential candidate since  Rolling Hills's formal incorporation as a city.

Government
Rolling Hills was incorporated in 1957.  It has a council-manager form of government. The city council consists of five members, one of whom is appointed mayor on an annual basis.

State and federal representation

Services
The Los Angeles County Sheriff's Department (LASD) operates the Lomita Station in Lomita, serving Rolling Hills.

The Los Angeles County Department of Health Services operates the Torrance Health Center in Harbor Gateway, Los Angeles, near Torrance and serving Rolling Hills.

Notable people
 Tracy Austin, former world #1 tennis player and two-time US Open winner
 Colin Baxter, professional football player
 Brandon Holt, professional tennis player and son of Tracy Austin.
 Parnelli Jones, former professional race car driver and Indy car team owner
 Erik Lorig (born 1986), NFL football player
 Alex McLeod, TV personality and host of Trading Spaces
 Greg Popovich, founder and owner of Castle Rock Winery
 Frank D. Robinson, founder of Robinson Helicopter Company
 John Tu, co-founder of Kingston Technology, a privately held, multinational computer technology corporation.
 Ethan Walden Brown, founder, president, and CEO of Beyond Meat.

See also 

 List of largest houses in the Los Angeles Metropolitan Area
 List of largest houses in the United States

References

External links

Rolling Hills
Rolling Hills
Rolling Hills
Rolling Hills
Rolling Hills
Populated places established in 1957
Rolling Hills